Meridolum depressum is a species of air-breathing land snail, terrestrial pulmonate gastropod mollusk in the family Camaenidae. This species is endemic to Australia.

References

depressum
Vulnerable fauna of Australia
Gastropods described in 1901
Taxonomy articles created by Polbot
Taxobox binomials not recognized by IUCN